Energija Hockey/HC Klaipėda is an ice hockey team located in Elektrėnai, Lithuania, which plays in the Lithuania Hockey League, the top tier of ice hockey in Lithuania. They play home games at the Elektrėnai Ice Palace and the Klaipėda Akropolis.

History
Energija Hockey/HC Klaipėda was founded in 2020 by coach Algis Poškis, and immediately joined the Lithuania Hockey League. In 2019 HC Klaipėda had partnered with fellow NLRL team Kaunas Baltų Ainiai, however, in the offseason they teamed up with the new team from Elektrėnai. Their maiden season in the NLRL was a torrid one, as of January 28, 2021 they have lost every game. Timur Muginov scored the first goal in franchise history, scoring in the first period against SC Energija.

Roster 
Updated January 28, 2021.

References

External links
 Energija Hockey/HC Klaipėda
 

Sport in Elektrėnai
Ice hockey teams in Lithuania
Lithuanian Hockey League teams
Ice hockey clubs established in 2020
2020 establishments in Lithuania